The 1973 CFL Draft composed of nine rounds where 93 Canadian football players were chosen from eligible Canadian universities and, for the first time, Canadian players playing in the NCAA. Prior to 1973, teams were given exclusive signing privileges to Canadian players who attended U.S. schools based on the territory he was domiciled. After the draft was expanded to include NCAA schools, teams were also permitted to exempt from the draft and select players from their area, regardless of where they attended school.

Territorial Exemptions

Montreal Alouettes                             Pat Bonnett  T  Idaho State

Ottawa Rough Riders                            Donn Smith  T  Purdue

Toronto Argonauts                              Louis Clare  TB  Minnesota

Toronto Argonauts  Peter Muller  TE  Western Illinois

Hamilton Tiger-Cats                            George Milosevic  E Cornell

Hamilton Tiger-Cats                                Bob Macoritti  K  Wooster

Winnipeg Blue Bombers                          Roy Albertson  T  Simon Fraser

Winnipeg Blue Bombers                              Wayne Ducharme  TB  Bowling Green

Saskatchewan Roughriders                       Terry Bolych  LB  Weber State

Saskatchewan Roughriders                           Andy McLeon  LB  Alberta

Calgary Stampeders                             Tom Forzani  WR  Utah State

Calgary Stampeders                                 Blaine Lamoreaux  LB  Washington State

Edmonton Eskimos                               Joe Worobec  T  Drake

Edmonton Eskimos                                   Garry Adam  DT  Alberta

Edmonton Eskimos                                   Rick McKay  LB  North Dakota State

British Columbia Lions                         Harold Grozadanich  G Boise State

British Columbia Lions                             Ross Clarkson  WR  Simon Fraser

British Columbia Lions  Robbie Allen  T  Bishop's

1st round
1. British Columbia Lions                          Brian Sopatyk  G  Boise State

2. Toronto Argonauts                               Barry Finlay  QB  McMaster

3. Calgary Stampeders  Mike Logan  QB  Eastern Michigan

4. Montreal Alouettes                              Pierre LeFebvre  DB  Saint Mary's

5. Montreal Alouettes                              Jacob Schwartzberg  K  Alberta

6. British Columbia Lions                          Slade Willis  WR  Drake

7. Edmonton Eskimos  Brian Jones  DE  Alberta

8. Saskatchewan Roughriders                        Art Edgson  DB  Idaho State

9. Edmonton Eskimos  Wayne Allison  QB  Waterloo Lutheran

2nd round
10. British Columbia Lions                         Paul Giroday  LB  California

11. Toronto Argonauts                              Greg Higson  HB  McMaster

12. Calgary Stampeders                             Paul Perras  G  McMaster

13. British Columbia Lions                         Bob Helman  TB  North Dakota State

14. Hamilton Tiger-Cats                            Ken Hass  LB  Moorhead

15. Winnipeg Blue Bombers                          Dale Potter  LB  Ottawa

16. Ottawa Rough Riders                            Bruce McMillan  TB  Mount Allison

17. Saskatchewan Roughriders                       Ted Passmore  TB  Waterloo Lutheran

18. British Columbia Lions                         Cor Doret  TB  Toronto

3rd round
19. British Columbia Lions                         Joe Fabiani  QB  Western Ontario

20. Toronto Argonauts                              Chris Skopelianos  DB  Western Ontario

21. Calgary Stampeders  Doug Thompson  TB  Otterbein

22. Edmonton Eskimos  Bill Sherwood  G  Ottawa

23. Montreal Alouettes                             Stacey Coray  DB  Waterloo Lutheran

24. Winnipeg Blue Bombers                          Nick Kanakos  DB  Simon Fraser

25. Ottawa Rough Riders                            Roger Comartin  DB  Alberta

26. Saskatchewan Roughriders  Gerry Harris  TE  Saskatchewan

27. Hamilton Tiger-Cats                            Gordon McColeman  DT  Waterloo Lutheran

4th round
28. British Columbia Lions                         Bill McGregor  WR  Simon Fraser

29. Toronto Argonauts                              Wayne Cuncic  G  Utah State

30. Calgary Stampeders                             Wayne Dunkley  QB  Toronto

31. Edmonton Eskimos                               Gerry Blacker  TB  Waterloo Lutheran

32. Montreal Alouettes                             Dave Mair  TE  Youngstown State

33. Winnipeg Blue Bombers                          Brian Warrender  HB Queen's

34. Ottawa Rough Riders                            Jim Budge  DB  Western Ontario

35. Saskatchewan Roughriders                       Mike Ewachnuik  DT  Alberta

36. Hamilton Tiger-Cats  Dave Kerr  TB  Western Ontario

5th round
37. British Columbia Lions                         Rudy Florio              TB             Youngstown State

38. Toronto Argonauts                              Brian Wetsell            DE             British Columbia

39. Calgary Stampeders                             Roan Kane                WR             Waterloo Lutheran

40. Edmonton Eskimos                               Dan Syratuik             T              McMaster

41. Montreal Alouettes  Bob Whitfield  T  Guelph

42. Winnipeg Blue Bombers                          Paul Hilborn             T              Simon Fraser

43. Saskatchewan Roughriders                       Lee Benard  DB  Manitoba

44. Hamilton Tiger-Cats  Jamie Spears             TB             McMaster

6th round
45. British Columbia Lions                         Terry Sharpe             G              Simon Fraser

46. Toronto Argonauts  Bill Ross                DE             Western Ontario

47. Calgary Stampeders  Allan Young  G Montana State

48. Edmonton Eskimos                               Garry Duffy  QB  LaCrosse State

49. Montreal Alouettes  John Cater               DB             Waterloo Lutheran

50. Winnipeg Blue Bombers  Fred Clarke              G              Western Ontario

51. Saskatchewan Roughriders                       Don Savich               TE             Alberta

52. Hamilton Tiger-Cats                            Mike Telepchuk           QB             Guelph

7th round
53. British Columbia Lions  Mike Flynn               DT             Waterloo

54. Toronto Argonauts                              Larry Jack  DT  New Brunswick

55. Calgary Stampeders                             Lorne Watters  LB  Calgary

56. Edmonton Eskimos  Brian Jones              DE            Alberta

57. Montreal Alouettes  Jim Drummond             G             Alberta

58. Winnipeg Blue Bombers                          Tim Crowe  T  Windsor

59. Saskatchewan Roughriders                       Nick Drakich             T             Windsor

60. Hamilton Tiger-Cats  Brian Dunn  DB  Northwood

8th round
61. British Columbia Lions  John Quinlan             HB            McMaster

62. Toronto Argonauts  Bill Hunter              DB            Western Ontario

63. Calgary Stampeders                             Brock Fownes  G  Carleton

64. Edmonton Eskimos  Doug Keene              TB            Eastern Michigan

65. Montreal Alouettes                             Mike Oulten             DB            Mount Allison

66. Winnipeg Blue Bombers  Bart Evans              G             Manitoba

67. Saskatchewan Roughriders                       Merv Janzen            DB             Saskatchewan

68. Hamilton Tiger-Cats                            Peter de Montigny      C              Ottawa

9th round

69. British Columbia Lions  Al Thomas              DB             Simon Fraser

70. Calgary Stampeders                             Denis Kelly            QB             Simon Fraser

71. Edmonton Eskimos  Dave Campbell          DB             Queen's

72. Montreal Alouettes                             Ed McEachern           LB             Guelph

73. Winnipeg Blue Bombers                          Dean Samson            DB             Manitoba

74. Hamilton Tiger-Cats  Bill Bunting           LB             Ottawa

75. Hamilton Tiger-Cats                            Jim Wakeman            TB             Windsor

References
Canadian Draft

Canadian College Draft
Cfl Draft, 1973